Agustín Javier Rodríguez (born 2 May 2004) is an Argentine footballer currently playing as a midfielder for Lanús.

Career statistics

Club

Notes

References

2004 births
Living people
People from Lomas de Zamora
Footballers from Buenos Aires
Argentine footballers
Argentina youth international footballers
Association football midfielders
Argentine Primera División players
Club Atlético Lanús footballers